The January 25, 2012 Vieira Fazenda office block collapse involved the progressive collapse of 3 commercial office buildings, split by R. Vieira Fazenda street in the municipality of Praça Floriano, Rio de Janeiro, Brazil.

The three buildings involved were (from west to east): Building 1 (a 22-story building located at Av. Alm. Barroso, 6 - Centro, Rio de Janeiro, 20031-000, Brazil), Building 2 (a 23-story building located at Av. Alm. Barroso, 22 - Centro, Rio de Janeiro, 20031-000, Brazil) and Building 3 (a 6-story building located at Av. Rio Branco, 180 - Centro, Rio de Janeiro, 20040-003, Brazil).

At 8:33 PM, the 23-story Building 2, began collapsing in the eastward direction towards the 6-story Building 3, which was located on the opposite side of R. Vieira Fazenda street.  Building 2 was structurally connected to the adjoining 22-story Building 1, which caused it to pull Building 1 laterally eastward during its collapse.  This extreme lateral shift caused the failure of enough support columns to result in the collapse of Building 1.  As Building 2 continued its collapse in the eastward direction, its debris crashed through the roof and western load bearing wall of the 6-story Building 3, causing it to collapse as well.

A total of 17 people were killed in the disaster. The initial collapse of the 23-story Building 2, was due to structural failure. Regulators said that any construction done violated local building codes as there were no construction permits on file for the building.

Aftermath 
By January 31, 2012, Rio officials proposed the creation of new regulations, including periodic reports on building's structural conditions, and more rigorous enforcement of the current regulations.

References

External links
 Rio de Janeiro building collapse leaves four dead, 22 missing (National Post, 26/01/2012)
 Rio buildings collapse, killing at least 6 people (CBCNews, 26/01/2012)
 Six dead after Rio de Janeiro building collapse (BBC News, 27/01/2012)
 Death toll rises as hopes fade in Brazil buildings collapse (CNN, 28/01/2012)

Building collapses in 2012
2012 industrial disasters
2012 disasters in Brazil
Disasters in Brazil
2010s in Rio de Janeiro
January 2012 events in South America
Building collapses in Brazil